The 2001 Chicago Marathon was the 24th running of the annual marathon race in Chicago, United States and was held on October 7. The elite men's race was won by Kenya's Ben Kimondiu in a time of 2:08:52 hours and the women's race was won by Catherine Ndereba, also of Kenya, in 2:18:47. Ndereba's time was a new marathon world record, improving 59 seconds on the time of Naoko Takahashi, set only one week earlier at the 2001 Berlin Marathon. Ndereba's record lasted until the 2002 Chicago Marathon, where Paula Radcliffe set a world record on the Chicago course for a second year running.

Results

Men

Women

References

Results. Association of Road Racing Statisticians. Retrieved 2020-04-10.

External links 
 Official website

Chicago Marathon
Chicago
2000s in Chicago
2001 in Illinois
Chicago Marathon
Chicago Marathon